Sar Taf (also Romanized as Sar Tāf) is a village in Qilab Rural District, Alvar-e Garmsiri District, Andimeshk County, Khuzestan Province, Iran. At the 2006 census, its population was 129, in 22 families.

References 

Populated places in Andimeshk County